Autódromo Internacional de Curitiba (also known as Autódromo de Pinhais and Circuito Raul Boesel) was a motorsports circuit located in Pinhais, Brazil. It has been host to the World Touring Car Championship, TC2000, Fórmula Truck and Stock Car Brasil racing. Until 2013 the circuit has also been host of the South American Formula 3 Series, namely the Formula 3 Sudamericana. The circuit also formerly hosted the Brazilian Formula Three Championship.

The circuit also hosted the "Festival Brasileiro de Arrancada", from 1992 to 2016, which was the biggest drag racing event in Latin America.

The circuit
Fabrizio Giovanardi of JAS Motorsport suggested the circuit is bumpy. Andy Priaulx of BMW Team UK suggested the circuit has a mix of massively fast and then medium speed turns which is not favorable BMW touring cars. Jordi Gené of SEAT Sport suggested that its turns are close to each other and they are high speed. The layout and types of corners on the track is actually similar to Motorsport Arena Oschersleben, but with more dramatic elevation changes.

The elevation changes between Entrada do Miolo and Pinheirinho reward well balanced cars. Confident drivers can gain a serious advantage through the heavily banked turns. Curva de Vitoria has quite a bit of positive camber and any exit speed will carry through, all the way down the straight. There is only one racing line through this fast corner, so the driver requires to line up behind the car in front and slingshot past it down the straight.

A1 Grand Prix series 
The circuit was scheduled to host a round of the A1 Grand Prix series in February 2006. However, after the schedule was revised, the circuit was removed as a host venue for the series.

Simulation / Video Games

Ending of Activities 
At the end of 2021, it was known the land of the circuit was sold. Since 2014, the Inepar group, the owner of Autodromo, entered in judicial recovery and the plan of recoveries at the time was to sell the circuit. This was postponed after a immobiliar crises throughout Brazil and gave a new opportunity for the circuit. The new plan is a project to build residential and commercial towers. The launch of these buildings is planned for the second half of 2022.

On December 17, 2021 the part of "Curva da Vitória" started to be demolished, but for a legal reasons the work stopped with complaints about the historical heritage of circuit and its land.

Lap records

The official fastest lap records at the Autódromo Internacional de Curitiba are listed as:

References

External links

Autódromo Internacional de Curitiba at Google Maps
Map and circuit history at RacingCircuits.info

Defunct motorsport venues
Curitiba
Sport in Curitiba
Drag racing venues
World Touring Car Championship circuits